Daniel Ignacio Fernandez del Castaño (born 1979 in Buenos Aires, Argentina) is an Argentine model and actor, who is Mister Argentina 2010, also was part of the cast of Yingo in 2008 and from January 2009 is a program participant Youth TVN, Calle 7.

Career
From an early age got into the modeling world, which opened up a role on television, in 2008 was part of the cast of the program Yingo, however a while after he retired to join program Calle 7.

Calle 7
Daniel get the 5th place in the first season of Calle 7, being removed a day before the Grand Final. While in the second season could reach the semifinal, getting 3rd place. Daniel is currently in competition for the third season. In 2010 debut as an actor in the miniseries of the program.

Filmography
 Yingo (2008)
 Calle 7 (2009–2010)
 Mr. Universo 2010(6th placed)
 personaje en la obra "monologos del pene" teatro monte carmelo(2011-2012)
 personaje en la obra "adentro & afuera" teatro alcala(2012)

References

1979 births
Argentine male models
Living people
People from Buenos Aires